(stylized as DIGIMONSTORY CYBERSLEUTH) is a role-playing video game developed by Media.Vision and published by Bandai Namco Entertainment that was released in Japan on March 12, 2015 for PlayStation Vita and PlayStation 4. Part of the Digimon franchise, the game is the fifth installment in the Digimon Story series, following 2011's Super Xros Wars, and the first to be released on home consoles. The game would be released in North America on February 2, 2016, becoming the first installment of the Digimon Story series to be released in North America since 2007's Digimon World Dawn and Dusk, and the first to be released under its original title.

A sequel, titled Digimon Story: Cyber Sleuth – Hacker's Memory, was released in Japan in 2017 and in Western territories in 2018. In July 2019, a port of the game and its sequel for Nintendo Switch and Windows, was announced for release on October 18, 2019, as Digimon Story Cyber Sleuth: Complete Edition, although the PC version was released a day early.

Gameplay 
Digimon Story: Cyber Sleuth is a role-playing game, played from a third-person perspective where players control a human character with the ability to command Digimon, digital creatures with their own unique abilities who do battle against other Digimon. Players can choose between either Palmon, Terriermon or Hagurumon as their starting partner at the beginning of the game, with more able to be obtained as they make their way into new areas. A total of 249 unique Digimon are featured, including seven that were available as DLC throughout the life of the game, and two which were exclusive to the Western release.  The title features a New Game Plus mode where players retain all of their Digimon, non-key items, money, memory, sleuth rank, scan percentages, and Digifarm progress.

The Complete Edition includes the 92 new Digimon from Hacker's Memory, for a total of 341 Digimon.

Plot

Players assume the role of Takumi Aiba (male) or Ami Aiba (female), a young Japanese student living in Tokyo while their mother, a news reporter, is working abroad. After receiving a message from a hacker, Aiba investigates the physical-interaction cyberspace network EDEN, where they meet Nokia Shiramine and Arata Sanada. The hacker gives them "Digimon Capture" programs and locks them in EDEN. While searching for an exit, Aiba meets Yuugo, leader of the hacker team "Zaxon"; Yuugo teaches Aiba how to use their Digimon Capture and tells them that Arata is a skilled hacker himself. Aiba meets up with Nokia and Arata, who unlocks a way out, but the three are then attacked by a mysterious creature that grabs Aiba and corrupts their logout process.

Aiba emerges in the real world as a half-digitized entity and is rescued by detective Kyoko Kuremi, head of the Kuremi Detective Agency, which specializes in cyber-crimes. Aiba manifests an ability, Connect Jump, which allows them to travel into and through networks. Recognizing their utility, Kyoko helps Aiba stabilize their digital body and recruits them as her assistant. They investigate a hospital ward overseen by Kamishiro Enterprises, which owns and manages EDEN, and finds it filled with patients of a phenomenon called "EDEN Syndrome," where users logged onto EDEN fall into a seemingly permanent coma. Aiba discovers their own physical body in the ward, before being confronted by a mysterious girl. The girl admits to knowing one of the other victims, and helps Aiba avoid Rie Kishibe, the current president of Kamishiro.

The mysterious girl approaches Kyoko and Aiba and reveals herself as Yuuko Kamishiro, the daughter of Kamishiro Industries' former president, and requests they investigate her father's purported suicide. With the assistance of Goro Mayatoshi, a detective in the Tokyo Police Department and an old friend of Kyoko's father, Kyoko and Aiba gather evidence regarding illegal activity within Kamishiro. Kyoko's plans are thwarted when Kishibe holds a sudden press conference, admitting to the activity and terminating several non-essential employees as scapegoats, which causes Mayatoshi's superiors to call off the accusations. Aiba, Arata, Yuuko, and Kyoko take advantage of an EDEN preview event to hack into the Kamishiro servers, learning of a "Paradise Lost Plan," and that Yuuko's older brother is a victim of EDEN Syndrome, a casualty of a failed beta test eight years ago apparently covered up by Kamishiro.

Nokia, with Aiba's help, reunites with an Agumon and Gabumon she met and bonded with in Kowloon; she learns from them that Digimon are not hacker programs, but living creatures from a "Digital World", and that Agumon and Gabumon came to EDEN for a purpose they can't remember. Nokia vows to help them recover their memories, but is hampered by her lack of fighting experience; after being soundly defeated by Yuugo's lieutenant Fei, she resolves to become stronger and forms her own group, the Rebels, to improve relations between humans and Digimon. This allows Agumon and Gabumon to digivolve into WarGreymon and MetalGarurumon, and gains her a large following, but Yuugo worries that she might interfere with his goal of protecting EDEN.

Meanwhile, Aiba assists Arata in investigating "Digital Shift" phenomena occurring around Tokyo. They meet Akemi Suedou, who identifies the creature behind the Digital Shifts as an Eater; a mass of corrupted data that consumes users' mental data, making it responsible for the EDEN Syndrome and Aiba's half-digital state. Eaters have links to a "white boy ghost" that keeps appearing around it, and by "eating" data can evolve into different forms. Arata, discouraged after witnessesing many friends become victims of EDEN Syndrome, decides to help Aiba upon learning the truth about their condition.

As Aiba continues their investigations, Jimiken "Jimmy KEN," a Japanese rock idol and disgruntled Zaxon hacker, breaks away from Zaxon and forms a group called the "Demons." Jimiken hijacks Tokyo's television signals, broadcasting a music video overlaid with subliminal messaging to hypnotize users into logging onto EDEN and entering the Demons' stronghold. Aiba defeats Jimiken, who reveals the signal hijacking equipment was given to him by Rie Kishibe in exchange for his loyalty, but his account is destroyed by Fei before he can be further interrogated.

Yuugo mobilizes hackers around EDEN to attempt a large-scale attack on Kamishiro Enterprise’s high-security servers codenamed "Valhalla." Arata intervenes, revealing he is the former leader of a hacker group that failed to hack the Valhalla server in the past, and initiates a battle between Yuugo's Zaxon hackers, his own group of veteran hackers, and Nokia's Rebels, supported by Aiba. The battle is interrupted when Rie unleashes Eaters in the server, revealing the entire event was a trap to get Yuugo to accumulate Eater prey, and forcibly logs Yuugo out, who is actually Yuuko using a false EDEN avatar modeled and named after her older brother. Rie informs Yuuko that she was using the avatar to manipulate her actions, and begins extracting Yuuko's memories.

Nokia's determination during the battle causes WarGreymon and MetalGarurumon to DNA Digivolve into Omnimon, who rescues the survivors and remembers that his real purpose of coming to EDEN was to save the Digital World from the Eaters, which were created from negative human emotions taking form in EDEN; the Digital World's ruler, King Drasil, determined that humans were the cause, and ordered the Royal Knights to investigate and put a stop to the attacks, but the Royal Knights became split, with some Knights advocating destroying humanity to wipe out the Eaters at their source, and others favoring a peaceful solution. Deducing that Rie is allied with the Knights who advocate destroying humanity, Aiba and their friends chase after her. When they confront Rie, she reveals her true identity as the Royal Knight Crusadermon, and that her "Paradise Lost Plan" is meant to gather energy via Tokyo's digital network, with which to open a gate between the physical and digital world as a preface to a full-scale invasion. Arata closes the dimensional gate by causing a citywide blackout and encounters Suedou, who reveals that he was the hacker who developed and distributed the Digimon Capture program. Aiba rescues Yuuko, who was being held captive by an Eater "Eve", but is pulled into a digital void, where they meet the real Yuugo. Yuugo wishes Aiba and their friends well, but asks them not to search for him, before a mysterious Digimon rescues Aiba from the digital void.

Aiba returns to the real world to discover a week has passed, and that Tokyo is besieged by a massive Digital Shift as a result of Crusadermon's actions, allowing Digimon to run amok in the real world, and they discover that their half-digital body is beginning to destabilize as their mental data disperses. The group begins to search for the other Royal Knights in the hopes of convincing them to join their side instead of trying to destroy humanity. In the process, Aiba and Yuuko encounter a former colleague of Suedou, who gives them details regarding the EDEN Beta test eight years ago; Kamishiro sent five children, one of which was Yuugo, into the Beta as a demonstration to investors, but something went wrong and the test was aborted. Four of the children logged out successfully, but were heavily traumatized, and Yuugo never regained consciousness, becoming the first EDEN Syndrome victim. To cover up the disaster, Suedou had the memories of the remaining four children erased.

Shortly after, Aiba and Arata encounter Suedou inside another Digital Shift; Arata is attacked and consumed by an Eater, but Suedou rescues him and sparks a specific memory in his mind. Arata, now suddenly obsessed with becoming stronger, leaves with Suedou and cuts all contact. Aiba and their friends manage to recruit most of the Royal Knights to their cause, and Aiba tracks down and confronts Crusadermon, seemingly defeating them, but, upon trying to return to Kyoko, falls into a Digital Shift containing what appears to be a recreation of the EDEN Beta test from eight years ago. Crusadermon, still alive, reveals the recreation to be a trap to capture Aiba and tells them the truth of the Beta test incident: The four other children who entered the beta with Yuugo were none other than Arata, Nokia, Yuuko, and Aiba themselves. When the children first entered the beta, they found a portal leading from EDEN to the Digital World. However, after opening it, an Eater followed them and consumed Yuugo; the other children, frightened, fled the Digital World back to Eden, leaving the portal open, allowing more Eaters to enter the Digital World. Overcome by despair at the revelation and already suffering from deterioration, Aiba allows their data to be absorbed into the simulation.

Meanwhile, Nokia and Yuuko, worried about Aiba after they failed to return, discover the entrance to the Beta Test recreation while searching for them. After learning the events of the Beta test incident, they locate what is left of Aiba, but are ambushed by Crusadermon. To save them, Kyoko enters the Digital Shift and reveals her true form as "Alphamon", the 13th Royal Knight, and assists them in defeating Crusadermon and restoring Aiba. Alphamon then explains that the "real" Kyoko and Rie were humans who were attacked by Eaters and inflicted with EDEN Syndrome, and that Alphamon and Crusadermon possessed their comatose bodies to hide in the human world, but unaware of each other. Despite Crusadermon's defeat, however, Alphamon informs Aiba that Leopardmon, Crusadermon's leader, is collecting power in order to evolve into an even more dangerous form, intending to destroy humanity themselves, and that they must be stopped before the evolution is complete.

Aiba and Alphamon head to the Tokyo Metropolitan Office to stop Leopardmon but are confronted by Arata, who reveals Suedou had sparked his memory of the beta test incident and his despair at being unable to save Yuugo. Arata transforms completely into an Eater "Adam" and attempts to assimilate Aiba, but Aiba defeats the Eater and saves Arata as they did with Yuuko. After stopping Leopardmon, Suedou appears and tells the group that they can stop the Eaters by traveling to the Digital World and extracting Yuugo from the core of the "Mother Eater," which will make it so that Eaters, and their effects on both worlds, never existed. The group arrives to find that the Mother Eater has completely taken over King Drasil; after defeating it, Aiba rescues Yuugo, but Yuugo reveals that he had been acting as a limiter on Eater's actions, and without him as a central conscience it has no restraint to simply eat everything indiscriminately.

Suedou takes the opportunity to merge with Mother Eater himself and becomes its new conscience, hoping to merge the Digital and Physical Worlds as one and recreate a world without sadness or misery. After defeating the merged Mother Eater, Aiba, despite suffering from extensive data deterioration and risking a complete collapse of their half-cyber body, Connect Jumps into the Mother Eater in an attempt to rescue Suedou. Suedou, amazed that Aiba would risk their own existence to save him, determines that the universe is better off being allowed to unfold and evolve in its own way rather than be influenced by him, and restores King Drasil, simultaneously erasing himself from history.

As Aiba returns to their friends and watches the reforming Digital World, Alphamon informs them they must return to the human world, as King Drasil will be reverting both worlds to a state in which contact with the Digimon eight years ago never occurred. Alphamon and the other Digimon bid farewell under the promise to meet again, and Aiba accompanies their friends back to the human world, but on the way back, Aiba's deteriorated half-cyber body dissolves before their friends' eyes, leaving behind only their Digivice.

In the real world, only Nokia, Arata, Yuugo, and Yuuko remember the events while Aiba is still comatose; Yuuko's father is alive again, Rie is an ordinary human woman, Suedou was never born, and Kyoko, despite there being evidence of her existence, cannot be found by the remaining four friends, who are still anxiously waiting for Aiba to wake up. Eventually, Aiba's scrap data is found by Alphamon, who has Aiba's Digimon team gather data from their memories to recreate Aiba's mind and restore them to their body. After being restored, Aiba meets Kyoko, who has no memory of them but, sensing a familiarity, invites them to work as her assistant.

Development
Digimon Story: Cyber Sleuth was first announced for the PlayStation Vita in a December 2013 issue of Japanese V Jump magazine, although its projected release date was still more than a year away. A teaser trailer was revealed near the end of the month on the official website, with a release window of Spring 2015 slated in a later September 2014 issue of V Jump. The game was developed by Media.Vision, and features character designs by Suzuhito Yasuda, known for his work on Shin Megami Tensei: Devil Survivor and Durarara!!.

In June 2015, Amazon Canada listed a North American version of Digimon Story: Cyber Sleuth under the title "Digimon World: Cyber Sleuth" for the PlayStation 4, hinting for a release in the region. Bandai Namco Games later confirmed English-language releases in North America and Europe for 2016, which would be a retail title for the PlayStation 4, and digital release for the PlayStation Vita. An English trailer was showcased at the 2015 Tokyo Game Show, with a final North American release date of February 2, 2016 announced the following month. Pre-order DLC bonuses for the North American physical PlayStation 4 version include two Digimon exclusive to the Western release - making for a total of 11 DLC Digimon, in-game items, and costumes for Agumon, whist the digital Vita version included the same pre-order items with two PlayStation Vita themes. Seven new Digimon were added as free DLC on March 10.

The game's music was composed by Masafumi Takada, with sound design by Jun Fukuda. Purchasers of the Japanese version of the game received a code for a free digital download of 13 tracks from the game grouped together as the Digimon Story: Cyber Sleuth Bonus Original Soundtrack. An official commercial soundtrack containing 60 tracks from the game was released in Japan on March 29, 2015 by Sound Prestige Records.

Cyber Sleuth was removed from the US PSN store on both PS4 and PS Vita on December 20, 2018. It remained up in Europe and South East Asia however. It was delisted in Europe/South East Asia at the end of January 2019.

The Nintendo Switch and PC versions were developed by h.a.n.d.

Cyber Sleuth is considered to be a reboot of the Digimon Story (series) and was developed with player feedback in mind. Kazumasa Habu decided to stick to the base concepts of the Story series which has simple turn based battles with a levelling system, as that would allow players to be able to play without having to read instructions. As the focus of the Story series was to collect and train Digimon, it was felt that it was important to make sure Cyber Sleuth at least had the same amount of trainable Digimon as the original Digimon Story game, Digimon World DS. With Cyber Sleuth having 3D models instead of sprites this was tough, but they were able to achieve this goal thanks to the work of the developers, Media.Vision. Feedback they had received from players was that they wanted to be able to see their Digimon during battle, which the  games didn't do, which is why they decided to use 3D models for Cyber Sleuth. Due to the experience of creating models for Digimon Adventure (video game), Habu was certain they would be able to take that knowledge into making them for Cyber Sleuth as well. The attack and victory animations in Cyber Sleuth were very popular and highly admired, with their quality being because one of the development staff was a big Digimon fan so put a lot of effort into studying even minor Digimon. When Cyber Sleuth was in development, overseas distributors were not open to the idea of localising Digimon games because according to them, the games were aimed at children, and the anime wasn't popular, but they were eventually to localise Cyber Sleuth because of the petitions signed by fans for Digimon games to be localised again.

Reception

The game holds a score of 75/100 on the review aggregator Metacritic, indicating generally favorable reviews. Digimon Story: Cyber Sleuth received a 34 out of 40 total score from Japanese magazine Weekly Famitsu, based on individual scores of 8, 9, 9, and 8.

Destructoid felt that the game wasn't much of a departure from older role-playing games, stating "The battle system is basically everything you've seen before from the past few decades of JRPGs," which includes random encounters that are "either deliciously or inexcusably old-school, depending on your tastes." While PlayStation LifeStyle felt that the game "isn’t a perfect video game interpretation of Bandai Namco’s long-running franchise," criticizing its linear dungeon design and "cheap" interface, its gameplay improvements were a step in the right direction "for fans who have been waiting to see the series get on Pokémon’s level." The website also commended the colorful art and character design of Suzuhito Yasuda, declaring that "Yasuda’s art brings crucial style and life to Digimon’s game series, which had spent previous years sort of fighting to establish its identity." Hardcore Gamer thought that the game was an important step forward for the franchise, stating "It isn’t perfect; its story and script could use some fine-tuning, and the world needs to be more interesting, but overall, this is a solid first step."

Sales
The PlayStation Vita version of Digimon Story: Cyber Sleuth sold 76,760 copies in its debut week in Japan, becoming the third high-selling title for the week. Although initial sales were less than its predecessor, Digimon World Re:Digitize, Cyber Sleuth managed to sell approximately 91.41% of all physical copies shipped to the region, and would go on to sell a total of 115,880 copies by the end of 2015, becoming the 58th best-selling software title that year.
In the UK, Digimon Story: Cyber Sleuth was the 11th best selling game in the week of release. The PlayStation Vita version was the best selling digital title in North America and Europe. The game also has good performance among Latin American countries (#2 Brazil, #3 Mexico, #3 Argentina, #3 Chile, #3 Costa Rica, #4 Guatemala, #6 Perú, #9 Colombia) and the PlayStation 4 version was the 20th best selling digital title in North America and the 19th in Europe on the PlayStation Store in the month of its release in their respective categories. By May 2019, Cyber Sleuth had sold over 800,000 copies worldwide. By October 2020, Cyber Sleuth and Hacker's Memory had shipped more than 1.5 million units worldwide combined. The Switch port of Complete Edition sold  4,536 copies in its first week in Japan.

Notes

References

External links

2015 video games
Bandai Namco Entertainment franchises
Bandai Namco games
Detective video games
Digimon video games
Multiplayer and single-player video games
Nintendo Switch games
PlayStation Vita games
PlayStation 4 games
Postcyberpunk
Role-playing video games
Video games developed in Japan
Video games about parallel universes
Video games featuring protagonists of selectable gender
Video games scored by Masafumi Takada
Video games with cross-platform play
Windows games
Video games set in Tokyo
H.a.n.d. games
Media.Vision games